Hachijō-in no Takakura (八条院高倉, c. 1176 - c. 1248) was a waka poet and Japanese noblewoman active in the early Kamakura period.

External links 
E-text of her poems in Japanese

1176 births
1248 deaths
Japanese poets
Minamoto clan
People of Kamakura-period Japan
Japanese women poets